= Circle View, West Virginia =

Unincorporated community in West Virginia, United States

Circle View
- Unincorporated community
- Location within the state of West Virginia Circle View (the United States)
- Coordinates: 37°47′48″N 81°15′2″W
- Country: United States
- State: West Virginia
- County: Raleigh
- Elevation: 2,457 ft (749 m)
- Time zone: UTC-5 (Eastern (EST))
  - Summer (DST): UTC-4 (EDT)
- GNIS feature ID: 1558352

Circle View is an unincorporated community located in Raleigh County, West Virginia, United States.
